is a Japanese light novel series by Kibidango Project, based on the Japanese folklore hero Momotarō. The light novel began serialization for free online in 2012. It features multiple illustrators who are rotated on a monthly basis. A "second season" of the light novel began serialization in 2013. A 4-panel manga series is also serialized online for free. An anime television series adaptation by Project No.9 and Tri-Slash aired between July and September 2014.

Characters

The protagonist. Based on Momotarō, Momoko is a young swordswoman who was born from a giant peach. She's capable of combining with her animal-god friends, called Momokyun Possession, in order to fuse their strengths and obtain more power. She discovers Onihime is her twin sister.

The Dog God and one of Momoko's companions. He has plenty of knowledge and holds manners as something very important. However, due to this, he is sometimes argumentative. Inugami is most skilled at close combat.

The Monkey God, one of Momoko's companions. Unlike Inugami, he is the kind of creature to take action before thinking. He is best at hand-to-hand combat. He tends to give points to Momoko.

The Pheasant God, one of Momoko's companions and the only female of the group. She can transform into a human, and is thought of by Momoko as an elder sister-like figure. She is best at aerial combat and reconnaissance.

The leader of all of Heaven. She sends Momoko and her friends to search for the shards of the Michimi Peach in order to stop the ogres from taking them. As they do this, she watches over them warmly.

The Celestial Maiden of fire. Her name means "apple". Ringo is bright and lively, and also has the strongest sense of justice within her team. She is always worrying about Momoko.

The Celestial Maiden of water. Her name means "watermelon". She is quite harsh toward her allies, but is actually very kind. Her weapon is a Cakraratna.

The Celestial Maiden of wind. Her name means "quince". She has a friendly personality, but due to this, she often fails at gathering the shards of the Michimi Peach.

The Celestial Maiden of earth. Her name means "chestnut". The most serious and responsible member of the group. Her weapon is a mallet

The assistant Sumeragi Tennyō. She is gentle and serious, but also has a fetish for sacrifices. Because of this, she can freeze over the mood of a scene in an instant.

A mysterious scientist who has her own plans for the fragments of the Michimi Peach.
Abe Seimei

An onmyoji who aids Momoko and her friends, but in secret works for Kaguya. He is based on the historical onmyouji Abe no Seimei.

Abe Seimei's mysterious familiar that even he doesn't understand. It is impossible to tell if Tōtetsu is a boy or a girl, but inspires affection from Momoko and the Celestial Maidens.

The princess of the Oni and step daughter of Jyako. She's a girl who is curious about the world, and also hates to lose. In addition, she hates anything that has twisted logic. She becomes Momoko's rival nearly immediately. She discovers that Momoko is her twin sister.

The King of the Onis and Onihime's step father. He has plans to collect the many fragments of the peach and use it to restore his clan to power.

One of the Four Oni Generals and the first one to appear. He only obeys those who are stronger than him. He fights with an iron rod.

One of the Four Oni Generals and the only female among them. She acts as an older sister for Onihime. Her weapon is a whip.

One of the Four Oni Generals, the youngest and the weakest. Enki and Onihime often bully him. His weapon is a pipe that can make illusions.

One of the Four Oni Generals. He never fights fair and seems to have plans of his own for the Michimi Peach. He enjoys improvised tactics like disguising himself and tricking enemies into fighting each other.

Media

Anime
An anime television series adaptation by Tri-Slash and Project No.9 aired in July 2014. The opening theme is "Pink Fantasy" performed by Haruka Chisuga.

Episode list

References

External links
 
 

2014 anime television series debuts
2010s fantasy novels
2012 Japanese novels
Anime and manga based on light novels
Japanese fantasy novels
Light novels
Light novels first published online
Project No.9
Sentai Filmworks
Works based on folklore